A vehicle tracking system combines the use of automatic vehicle location in individual vehicles with software that collects these fleet data for a comprehensive picture of vehicle locations. Modern vehicle tracking systems commonly use GPS or GLONASS technology for locating the vehicle, but other types of automatic vehicle location technology can also be used. Vehicle information can be viewed on electronic maps via the Internet or specialized software.  Urban public transit authorities are an increasingly common user of vehicle tracking systems, particularly in large cities.

Active versus passive tracking
Several types of vehicle tracking devices exist. Typically they are classified as "passive" and "active". "Passive" devices store GPS location, speed, heading and sometimes a trigger event such as key on/off, door open/closed. Once the vehicle returns to a predetermined point, the device is removed and the data downloaded to a computer for evaluation. Passive systems include auto download type that transfer data via wireless download. "Active" devices also collect the same information but usually transmit the data in near-real-time via cellular or satellite networks to a computer or data center for evaluation.

Many modern vehicle tracking devices combine both active and passive tracking abilities: when a cellular network is available and a tracking device is connected it transmits data to a server; when a network is not available the device stores data in internal memory and will transmit stored data to the server later when the network becomes available again.

Historically, vehicle tracking has been accomplished by installing a box into the vehicle, either self-powered with a battery or wired into the vehicle's power system.  For detailed vehicle locating and tracking this is still the predominant method; however, many companies are increasingly interested in the emerging cell phone technologies that provide tracking of multiple entities, such as both a salesperson and their vehicle.  These systems also offer tracking of calls, texts, web use and generally provide a wider range of options.

Typical architecture
Major constituents of the GPS-based tracking are:

 GPS tracking unit: The device fits into the vehicle and captures the GPS location information apart from other vehicle information at regular intervals to a central server. Other vehicle information can include fuel amount, engine temperature,  altitude, reverse geocoding, door open/close, tire pressure, cut off fuel, turn off ignition, turn on headlight, turn on taillight, battery status, GSM area code/cell code decoded, number of GPS satellites in view, glass  open/close, fuel amount, emergency button status, cumulative idling, computed odometer, engine RPM, throttle position, GPRS status and a lot more. Capability of these devices actually decide the final capability of the whole tracking system; most vehicle tracking systems, in addition to providing the vehicle's location data, feature a wide range of communication ports that can be used to integrate other onboard systems, allowing to check their status and control or automate their operation.
 GPS tracking server: The tracking server has three responsibilities: receiving data from the GPS tracking unit, securely storing it, and serving this information on demand to the user. 
 User interface: The UI determines how one will be able to access information, view vehicle data, and elicit important details from it.

Common uses

Vehicle tracking systems are commonly used by fleet operators for fleet management functions such as fleet tracking, routing, dispatching, driving behavior, on-board information and security. Some vehicle tracking systems are bundled with or interface with fleet management software. Along with commercial fleet operators, urban transit agencies use the technology for a number of purposes, including monitoring schedule adherence of buses in service, triggering automatic changes of buses' destination sign displays once the vehicle approaches the bus terminus (or other set location along a bus route such as a particular bus stop along the route), and triggering pre-recorded (or even synthetic speech) bus stop, route (and its destination) or service announcements for passengers.

The American Public Transportation Association estimated that, at the beginning of 2009, around half of all transit buses in the United States were already using a GPS-based vehicle tracking system to trigger automated stop announcements. This can refer to external announcements (triggered by the opening of the bus's door) at a bus stop, announcing the vehicle's route number and destination, primarily for the benefit of visually impaired customers, or to internal announcements (to passengers already on board) identifying the next stop, as the bus (or tram) approaches a stop, or both; the latter are often also displayed on an internal LED display or LCD monitor connected to the system while the loudspeakers play them. Data collected as a transit vehicle follows its route is often continuously fed into a computer program which compares the vehicle's actual location and time with its schedule, and in turn produces a frequently updating display for the driver, telling him/her how early or late he/she is at any given time, potentially making it easier to adhere more closely to the published schedule.

Such programs are also used to provide customers with real-time information as to  the waiting time until arrival of the next bus or tram/streetcar at a given stop, based on the nearest vehicles' actual progress at the time, rather than merely giving information as to the scheduled time of the next arrival.  Transit systems providing this kind of information assign a unique number to each stop, and waiting passengers can obtain information by entering the stop number into an automated telephone system or an application on the transit system's website.

Some transit agencies provide a virtual map on their website, with icons depicting the current locations of buses in service on each route, for customers' information, while others provide such information only to dispatchers or other employees.

Other applications include monitoring driving behavior, such as an employer of an employee, or a parent with a teen driver.

Vehicle tracking systems are also popular in consumer vehicles as a theft prevention, monitoring and retrieval device. Police can simply follow the signal emitted by the tracking system and locate the stolen vehicle. When used as a security system, a Vehicle Tracking System may serve as either an addition to or replacement for a traditional car alarm. Some vehicle tracking systems make it possible to control the vehicle remotely, including block doors or engine in case of emergency. The existence of vehicle tracking device then can be used to reduce the insurance cost, because the loss-risk of the vehicle drops significantly.

Vehicle tracking systems are an integrated part of the "layered approach" to vehicle protection, recommended by the National Insurance Crime Bureau (NICB) to prevent motor vehicle theft. This approach recommends four layers of security based on the risk factors pertaining to a specific vehicle. Vehicle Tracking Systems are one such layer and are described by the NICB as "very effective" in helping police recover stolen vehicles.

Some vehicle tracking systems integrate several security systems, for example by sending an automatic alert to a phone or email if an alarm is triggered or the vehicle is moved without authorization, or when it leaves or enters a geofence.

Other scenarios in which this technology is employed include:

Stolen vehicle recovery: Both consumer and commercial vehicles can be outfitted with RF or GPS units to allow police to do tracking and recovery. In the case of LoJack, the police can activate the truck or car tracking unit in the vehicle directly and follow tracking signals.
Asset tracking: Companies needing to track valuable assets for insurance or other monitoring purposes can now plot the real-time asset location on a map and closely monitor movement and operating status.
Field service management: Companies with a field service workforce for services such as repair or maintenance, must be able to plan field workers’ time, schedule subsequent customer visits and be able to operate these departments efficiently. Vehicle tracking allows companies to quickly locate a field engineer and dispatch the closest one to meet a new customer request or provide site arrival information.
Field sales: Mobile sales professionals can access real-time locations. For example, in unfamiliar areas, they can locate themselves as well as customers and prospects, get driving directions and add nearby last-minute appointments to itineraries. Benefits include increased productivity, reduced driving time and increased time spent with customers and prospects.
Trailer tracking: Haulage and Logistics companies often operate lorries with detachable load carrying units. The part of the vehicle that drives the load is known as the cab and the load carrying unit is known as the trailer. There are different types of trailer used for different applications, e.g., flat bed, refrigerated, curtain sider, box container.
Surveillance: A tracker may be placed on a vehicle to follow the vehicle's movements.
Transit tracking: temporary tracking of assets or cargoes from one point to another. Users will ensure that the assets do not stop on route or do a U-Turn in order to ensure the security of the assets.
Fuel Monitoring: monitor the fuel through tracking device (with help of fuel sensor connected to the device).
Distance Calculation: calculate the distance travelled by the fleet.
OBD II – Plug and play interface which provides most engine diagnostics information.

Vehicle tracking systems are widely used worldwide. Components come in various shapes and forms but most use GPS technology and GSM services. Newer Vehicle tracking systems also use the latest NB-IoT technology that can provide low power consumption and optimized data transmission rates. Additionally, these systems may also feature short range data communication systems such as WiFi. While most will offer real-time tracking, others record real time data and store it to be read, in a fashion similar to data loggers. Systems like these track and record and allow reports after certain points have been solved

Vehicle OBD tracking systems 
Vehicle OBD tracking systems make use of OBD GPS trackers that plug into the onboard diagnostic (OBD) port of light, medium, or heavy-duty vehicle. A cellular OBD GPS tracker directly communicates with the cell tower for sending the location and other vehicle performance data to the server over the cellular wireless network. Usually, the tracker device draws power from the OBD port itself and contains a built-in antenna along with a GPS module for receiving the GPS signal. In addition, OBD trackers communicate with the different vehicle subsystems for receiving vehicle diagnostic and fuel consumption related data. Users can view the information using standalone software or web browser from a desktop/laptop computer or using smartphone apps.

Fleet management tracking 
Aside from theft-prevention, the most common use of vehicle tracking is in logistics and transport. These systems make use of GPS(Global Positioning System)  and GSM(Global System for Mobile Communication) technology to provide precise and constant location telematics to an individual fleet manager. These systems are typically equipped with features to monitor statistics such as; fuel consumption, average speed, current driver time and location. There has been a recent increase in demand for this technology as EU regulations place increased restrictions on the hours driver are allowed to work in a given day. It is currently limited to 9 hours per day. Companies are legally obligated to install a tachograph in any vehicle that is expected to carry goods. This obligation has led many to attempt to cauterize this potentially onerous obligation, instead turning it into a benefit. Fleet management systems use GPS & GSM technology. Much like other forms of trackers, although due to their nature they are equipped with more thorough diagnostic features.

Other uses such as Trailer Tracking, Fuel Monitoring, Distance Calculation, Asset Tracking, and  Field Sales can all be incorporated into a fleet management solution.

Unconventional uses

Industries not traditionally known to use vehicle tracking systems (logistics and transportation industries are the ones that have traditionally incorporated vehicle tracking system into their operations) have started to use it in creative ways to improve their processes or businesses.

The hospitality industry has caught on to this technology to improve customer service. For example, a luxury hotel in Singapore has installed vehicle tracking systems in their limousines to ensure they can welcome their VIPs when they reach the hotel.

Vehicle tracking systems used in food delivery vans may alert if the temperature of the refrigerated compartment moves outside of the range of safe food storage temperatures.
Car rental companies are also using it to monitor their rental fleets.

See also
Anti-hijack system
Automatic number plate recognition
Automatic vehicle location
Fleet management
Fleet telematics
Fleet tracking
GPS tracking server
GPS tracking unit
GPS wildlife tracking
Intelligent transportation system
InVANET
Mobile phone tracking
Privacy law, informational self-determination, privacy, data security
Telematics
Track and trace
Tracking system
Trailer tracking
Vehicle infrastructure integration

References

Automotive accessories
Global Positioning System
Public transport
Road transport
Satellite navigation
Vehicle technology
Vehicle security systems
Geopositioning